The Le Roi des montagnes ("The king of the mountains") is a French-language novel published in 1857 by Edmond About. A film adaptation starring Lucile Saint-Simon and Claude Rollet was released in 1962.

Summary 
A young German botanist fresh out of the University is sent to Greece by the Hamburg Botanical Garden to study flora. In search of rare plants, he met two English women, a mother and her daughter, on the road that leads to the Parnitha. All three are abducted by a band of brigands led by Hatzistavros, "the king of the mountains", known for his cruelty. Given the refusal of the old English lady to pay the ransom, the botanist, loving the daughter, try several times to escape. The narrator presents a vivid account of brigandry and corruption mid- 18th century Athens. The westerner's colonial glance is evident in the book.

References

1857 French novels
1857 in France
Novels set in Greece